The Danube is the second longest river in Europe.

Danube may also refer to:

Places
 Danube Banovina, a banovina or province of the Kingdom of Yugoslavia (1929–1945)
 Danube Canyon, a large submarine canyon in the Black Sea
 Danube, Minnesota, a city
 Danube, New York, a town
 Danube Planum, a rifted mesa on Jupiter's moon Io
 Danube Sinkhole, Upper Danube Nature Park, Baden-Württemberg, Germany
 Danube Vilayet, a vilayet or province of the Ottoman Empire from 1864 to 1878

Ships
 Danube class motorship, a class of Russian river passenger ships
 Danube (ship), a Nourse Line sailing ship of the late 19th century
 HMS Danube, a wooden paddle vessel, and a cancelled gunboat

Other uses
 Danube (geology), a timespan in the glacial history of the Alps
 Battle of the Danube, part of the Russo-Turkish War
 Danube, the codename of the Warsaw Pact invasion of Czechoslovakia in August 1968
 Danube Bridge, a bridge across the Danube River linking the Bulgarian city of Ruse and the Romanian city of Giurgiu
 Danube Bridge 2, a road and rail bridge between the cities of Calafat, Romania and Vidin, Bulgaria
 Danube class starship, a fictional starship class in the Star Trek universe
 Danube Company, a supermarket and hypermarket chain in Saudi Arabia
 Danube (Dubai Metro), a station on the Dubai Metro, UAE
 Danube (Paris Métro), a station on the Paris Métro, France
 Danube platform, an AMD mobile platform for portable computers
 Danube Promenade, Budapest, Hungary
 Danube (restaurant), in New York

See also
 Danube Army, a unit of the Russian Empire created shortly before Napoleon's invasion of Russia
 Danube Legion, a unit of Poles in the service of Napoleonic France
 Donauinsel or Danube Island, Vienna, Austria
 Donaukanal or Danube Canal, Vienna, Austria
 Donauradweg or Danube Cycle Trail, a bicycle trail along the Danube River in many countries
 
 Donau (disambiguation)